The Nadaswaram  (nādḥasvaram) is a double reed wind instrument from South India. It is used as a traditional classical instrument in Tamil Nadu, Andhra Pradesh, Telangana, Karnataka, and Kerala.

This instrument is "among the world's loudest non-brass acoustic instruments". It is a wind instrument partially similar to the North Indian shehnai, but much longer, with a hardwood body, and a large flaring bell made of wood or metal.

In South Indian culture, the nadasvaram is considered to be very auspicious, and it is a key musical instrument played in almost all Hindu weddings and temples of the South Indian tradition. It is part of the family of instruments known as mangala vadyam (lit. mangala "auspicious", vadya "instrument"). The instrument is usually played in pairs, and accompanied by a pair of drums called thavil; it can also be accompanied with a drone from a similar oboe, called the ottu.

History 
The nadasvaram is referred to in many ancient Tamil texts. The Cilappatikaram refers to an instrument called the "vangiyam". The structure of this instrument matches that of a nadasvaram. Since there are seven holes played with seven fingers, this was also called as the "eḻil". This instrument, too, is played in Tamil Nadu, and is popular among the Tamil diaspora.

Construction 

It is a double reed instrument with a conical bore which gradually enlarges toward the lower end. The top portion has a metal staple into which is inserted a small metallic cylinder which carries the mouthpiece made of reed. Besides spare reeds, a small ivory or horn needle is attached to the instrument, and used to clear the reed of saliva and other debris and allows free passage of air. A metallic bell forms the bottom end of the instrument.

Traditionally the body of the nadasvaram is made out of a tree called  (Tamil ஆச்சா; Hindi अंजन), although nowadays bamboo, sandalwood, copper, brass, ebony, and ivory are also used. For wooden instruments, old wood is considered the best, and sometimes wood salvaged from demolished old houses is used.

The nadasvaram has seven finger-holes, and five additional holes drilled at the bottom which can be stopped with wax to modify the tone. The nadasvaram has a range of two and a half octaves, similar to the Indian bansuri flute, which also has a similar fingering. Unlike the flute where semi and quarter tones are produced by the partial opening and closing of the finger holes, in the nadasvaram they are produced by adjusting the pressure and strength of the air-flow into the pipe. Due to its intense volume and strength, it is largely an outdoor instrument, and much more suited for open spaces than for indoor concerts.

Players 

Some of the greatest early nadasvaram players include:
 Thirumarukal Nadesa Pillai
 T.N. Rajarathnam Pillai (1898-1956)
 Thiruvengadu Subramania Pillai,
 Vedaranyam Vedamoorthy
 Karukurichi Arunachalam (1921-1964)
 Kulikkarai P Rajendran Pillai(1970-2019)
 Thirucherai Sivasubramanian Pillai
 Thiruvarur S Latchappa Pillai
 Acharyapuram Chinnathambillai (b. 1928)
 Kulikkarai Pichaiyappa
 M.S. Ponnuthayi (1928 - 2012)
 Kizhvelur N.G. Ganesan
 Andankoil A V Selvarathnam Pillai
 Thiruvizha Jayashankar (b. 1940)
 Brother teams of Keeranur and Thiruveezhimizhalai,
 Semponnarkoil Brothers S R G Sambandam and Rajanna.
 Dharumapuram S. Abiramisundaram Pillai and his son Dharumapuram A Govindarajan
 
 Sheik Chinna Moulana ( 1924 - 1999)
 Gosaveedu shaik Hassan sahieb  (1928-2021) 
 Sheik Mahaboob Subhani
 Kaleeshabi Mahaboob
 Namagiripettai Krishnan (1924 - 2001)
 Madurai M.P.N. Sethuraman (1928 - 2000)
 M.P.N. Ponnuswamy (b. 1932)
 Ponnusamy brothers
 Alaveddy N.K. Pathmanathan
 Mambalan M.K.S. Shiva
 S. R. D. Vaidyanathan (1929 - 2013)
 Seshampatti T Sivalingam
 Domada Chittabbayi (1930 - 2002)
 Injikudi E.M. Subramaniam
 Umapathy Kandasamy (1950 - 2017)
 U.E.Palanivel, Chennai
 Kundala Kambar, Nagercoil (1965)
 Sankarapandia Kambar, Tirunelveli
 Tiruvalaputtur T K Venupilla
 Kulikkarai Brothers K.M Daksaha Moorthi Pillai & K.M Ganeshan Pillai
 Pattamangalam, Selvaraj

American composers such as Lewis Spratlan   have expressed admiration for the nadasvaram, and a few jazz musicians have taken up the instrument: Charlie Mariano (b. 1923) is one of the few non-Indians able to play the instrument, having studied it while living in India. Vinny Golia, J. D. Parran, and William Parker have performed and recorded with the instrument. The German saxophonist Roland Schaeffer also plays it, having studied from 1981 to 1985 with Karupaia Pillai.

In popular culture 
Among the Tamil movies, two released in the 1960s, namely Konjum Salangai(1962) starring Gemini Ganesan and Thillana Mohanambal(1968) starring Sivaji Ganesan, featured nadasvaram playing characters. For the Konjum Salankai movie, Karukurichi Arunasalam Pillai provided the nadasvaram music. Madurai Sethuraman and Ponnusamy brothers were employed for the nadasvaram playing duo characters Sivaji Ganesan and A.V.M. Rajan for the Thillana Mohanambal movie director AP Nagarajan dedicated this movie to legend karukurichi arunachalam

See also

 Tavil
 Stone nadasvaram

References

External links
 Images from The Beede Gallery Shawms (Ottu and Nagaswaram), Southern India, ca. 1900-1940. National Music Museum, University of South Dakota.

Carnatic music instruments
Single oboes with conical bore
Indian musical instruments